Ernest Graham Ingham (30 January 1851 – 9 April 1926) was an eminent Anglican bishop and author living at the end of the 19th and beginning of the 20th centuries.

Ingham was born in Bermuda, the seventh child and third son of Samuel Saltus Ingham, Speaker of the House of Assembly of Bermuda. He was educated at Bishop's College School in Canada and Christ's College, Cambridge — gaining his Cambridge Master of Arts (MA Cantab) —, and ordained in 1877. He was Organizing Secretary of the Church Missionary Society (CMS) for West Yorkshire and then Vicar of St Matthew's, Leeds until his appointment to the episcopate as the fifth Bishop of Sierra Leone.

On returning to England he was Rector of Stoke-next-Guildford from 1897 to 1904, Home Secretary of the CMS until 1912 and finally Vicar of St Jude's, Southsea. At some point, he became a Doctor of Divinity (DD).

He was buried in the churchyard at Aldingbourne, West Sussex.

Works
Sierra Leone after a Hundred Years, 1894
From Japan to Jerusalem, 1911 (Publisher: London : Church Missionary Society)
Sketches in Western Canada, 1913

References

External links
 

1851 births
Bishop's University alumni
Alumni of St Mary Hall, Oxford
19th-century Anglican bishops in Sierra Leone
British Anglican missionaries
Bishop's College School alumni
Anglican missionaries in Sierra Leone
Anglican bishops of Sierra Leone
1926 deaths
Members of the House of Assembly of Bermuda